Correbia punctigera is a moth of the subfamily Arctiinae. It was described by Max Gaede in 1926.

References

Euchromiina
Moths described in 1926